A kuphar (also transliterated kufa, kuffah, quffa, quffah, etc.) is a type of coracle or round boat traditionally used on the Tigris and Euphrates rivers in ancient and modern Mesopotamia. Its circular shape means that it does not sail well against the current, as it tends to spin, but makes it safe, sturdy and easy to construct.  A kuphar is propelled by paddling, rowing or poling.

Etymology
The word "kuphar" is derived from the Arabic word , meaning a basket woven from reeds and leaves. The boat visually resembles a basket and is used for a similar purpose: transporting fruits, vegetables, and other goods. The Arabic word in turn originated from the Akkadian word , meaning basket.

History
Reliefs depicting kuphars have been found in Assyrian ruins dating to the reigns of Kings Ashurnasirpal II (883 to 859 BC), Sennacherib (705 to 681 BC), and Ashurbanipal (668 to 627 BC), who reigned during the 9th, 8th, and 7th centuries BC, respectively. A translation of a tablet found by an amateur historian places the kuphar's origin even further in the past, in the Old Babylonian period (c.1830–1531 BC), although this translation is disputed.

Kuphars were described by Greek historian Herodotus, who visited Babylon around 450 BC:

Five thousand Greek talents would be 143 tons (130 tonnes). This is likely an exaggeration, although carvings of large kuphars carrying cut stones have been found in Assyrian ruins. These large kuphars were propelled by four rowers and relied partially on inflated hide sacks attached port and starboard to stay afloat. More reliable and recent analyses have determined that the largest ancient kuphar measured 18 feet (5.5 m) in diameter and could transport up to 16 tons.

There were two major forms of construction used — hides stretched over a framework, as described by Herodotus, and woven bundles of reeds or basketry, waterproofed with bitumen. Boats of this sort were still used in modern times, being described by British ethnographer James Hornell in The Coracles of the Tigris and Euphrates (1938).

Biblical significance

A Babylonian cuneiform tablet on display at the British Museum suggests that Noah's Ark may have been a large kuphar. This tablet was translated by professor Irving Finkel and found to contain an ancient flood narrative that may have inspired the story of Noah's Ark. Following his translation, professor Finkel organized the construction of a large vessel of this kind, though he claimed that his 35 tonne ship was a scaled-down version of the full-sized ark. Finkel attempted to launch his "ark" in Kerala, India, in 2014, but was unsuccessful. He attributed the failed launch of his double-decker vessel to the low quality of bitumen available in the area.

The tablet describes the flood myth of Atrahasis, a Babylonian hero who built an ark to shelter life from a flood of a divine origin that is thought to have started as a river flood. This ark was, according to the legend described on the tablet, a large kuphar, with either one or two decks, and a total deck area of 14,400 cubits2 (3600 m2). Noah's Ark is traditionally described as having a similar deck plan and a nearly identical deck area of 15,000 cubits2 (a difference of 4%). This has led Finkel to conclude that "the iconic story of the Flood, Noah, and the Ark as we know it today certainly originated in the landscape of ancient Mesopotamia, modern Iraq."

Some evidence has been found of Neo-Assyrian legends depicting infants being cast adrift in kuphars on the river, similar to how baby Moses was cast adrift in a basket in the Book of Exodus. This has led some scholars to conclude that the basket that Moses was set adrift in on the Nile may have in fact been a kuphar.

Modern use

Kuphars remained in widespread use as water taxis, lighters, fishing boats, and ferries in early 20th century Iraq, especially around Baghdad. These vessels are typically 4.5–10 feet (1.4–3 meters) wide at the opening and have drafts of 2.5–4 feet (0.8–1.2 meters) and freeboards of 6–8 inches (15–20 cm) fully loaded. They typically transport four to five people although they can carry up to 20. Larger kuphars can transport four to five tons, equivalent to three horses, several people, and other assorted cargo.

Kuphar use declined following the development of the automobile and the widespread construction of roads and bridges across modern Iraq. However, they could still be seen around Iraq until the 1970s.

Modern kuphars are made of woven bundles of reeds waterproofed with bitumen, as in ancient times. James Hornell described them thus:

Tennyson referenced the boats in his 1827 poem Persia,

Similar vessels
The kuphar's similarity to other circular boats has been noted by many authors. This is not a coincidence: Hornell, Marie-Christine De Graeve, and other ethnographers and anthropologists believe that the kuphar is the common ancestor of the coracles that are widely used across Eurasia, particularly in the British Isles and South and Southeast Asia. However, the similar Irish currach was independently developed by the ancient Celts.

See also
 Fishing coracle
 Kayak
 Umiak

References

External links
 

Types of fishing vessels
Iraqi culture
Riverboats
Rowing boats